Blueprint : Blaupause is a German novel written by Charlotte Kerner and first published in 1998. The story involves a woman who clones herself in order to pass on her musical genius, only to find her clone-daughter turning against her when she learns the truth. It won the Deutscher Jugendliteraturpreis

Film, TV or theatrical adaptations
The novel was adapted to film as Blueprint in 2003.

Publication
Beltz & Gelberg, 1999,  (in German)

References

1999 German novels
German science fiction novels
Novels about cloning
German novels adapted into films
Beltz & Gelberg books